Bantham  is a coastal village in south Devon, England. It is in the South Hams district and lies on the estuary of the River Avon a quarter of a mile from the sea at Bigbury Bay.

History
Originally a fishing village, it was first documented as a port selling tin and various tin-made products to the Gauls during Roman times. During their occupation, the Romans built a large settlement to protect the entrance to the river at Bantham Ham, behind the dunes and to the west of the current village. The settlement, with evidence of an associated seasonal trading market, existed well into post-Roman Britain times. Later covered by sand, the settlement is known to have existed from the mid-18th century, after storms uncovered its burnt remains. As the landowners drained the local marshes during the 19th century, the workers were in part rewarded by being allowed to take the recovered human bones away and sell them. Since 1978, extensive archeological excavations have tracked the extent of the settlement, and it is now a scheduled ancient monument protected by English Heritage.

Between 1750 and around 1880, it became a regional centre for the pilchard trading industry during the Cornish pilchard-boom. During this time, the extensive regional stocks of pilchards were processed at salting plants in Cornwall, and then shipped to the Roman Catholic countries of France and Spain. From there, there were either consumed locally or traded directly to Italy – still the primary market for salt pilchards today – where they were used in rustic dishes to give flavour to the staple diet of pasta or polenta. Due to over-fishing, as the trade quickly died the village went into steep decline.

Evans Estates and ownership
Post his World War I duties, in 1919 Lt Cdr Charles Evans bought the defunct village smithy. After World War II the family placed the estate into a private limited company, Evans Estates (1956) Limited, which today owns most of the village (consisting of 40 homes, a pub and a shop), the harbour, Bantham beach and an 18-hole cliff-top golf course. The family have always tightly managed the village, offering manageable rents, and neither renting out property seasonally nor allowing second or holiday homes.

In light of rising costs, and requests from beach visitors, the company board agreed the introduction of both a Gastrobus (as opposed to a large café), and the lease of the surfing rights to the beach to a surf school. It has since been reported, that the decision and resultant reaction by some residents was the key-driver behind the family in November 2013 deciding to sell the village from May 2014, with an estimated price of £11.5M.

The estate was sold in its entirety in July 2014 to a private family, who pledged to "continue to manage and conserve the Estate in the same manner as [the Evans family] have done for the next 100 years."

Present
The village has a privately owned beach which is popular with surfers, and is backed by dunes. The beach offers views of nearby Burgh Island.

The river Avon can be crossed via a seasonal pedestrian ferry. This operates between 10 am and 11 am and again between 3 pm and 4 pm on Monday – Saturdays from late April to late September. The ferry costs £2.50 each way and is popular with walkers on the South West Coast Path as it avoids the need to walk around the Avon estuary.

In popular culture
Bantham is referenced in the G.E.M. song released in 2015 called "Train To Bantham".

References

External links
Evans Estates – Bantham website 

Beaches of Devon
Villages in South Hams